is a Japanese actress and former fashion model best known for her role in the Japanese medical drama Doctor-X: Surgeon Michiko Daimon. She also performs the voice of Black Widow in the Japanese-language releases of the Avengers film series.

Career
Yonekura studied classical ballet for 15 years from the age of five. Represented by the Oscar Promotion agency, she won a national young beauty award in 1992. In 1993, she started her career as a model, working for fashion magazines such as CanCam. She announced her intention to start her acting career in June 1999. Her acting debut was in the TBS television drama Koi no Kamisama (God of Love), and has appeared in many dramas ever since.

Yonekura played the role of Roxie Hart in the Japanese-language production of Chicago in Tokyo 2008 and in 2010. She then learned the role in English and made her Broadway debut in 2012, reprising her role in July 2017, and again in July 2019.

Filmography

Television / Net Drama
 Koi no Kamisama (2000, TBS)
 Tenki-yoho no Koibito (2000, TBS)
 Hatachi no Kekkon (2000, TBS)
 Straight News (2000, NTV)
 Love Revolution (2001, Fuji TV)
 Hikon Kazoku (2001, Fuji TV)
 Pretty Girls (2002, TBS)
 Sonagi Special (2002, MBC / Fuji TV)
 Artificial Beauty (Seikei Bijin) (2002, Fuji TV)
 Musashi (2003, NHK)
 Okusama wa Majo (2004, TBS)
 Kurokawa no Techo (2004, TV Asahi), Motoko Haraguchi
 Kurokawa No Techo Special (2005, TV Asahi), Motoko Haraguchi
 Nyokei Kazoku (2005, TBS)
 Haru to Natsu Special (2005, NTV)
 Onna no Ichidaiki (2005, TBS), Haruko Sugimura
 Kemonomichi (2006, TV Asahi)
 Fushin no Toki (2006, TV Asahi)
 Warui Yatsura (2007, TV Asahi/ABC TV)
 Katagoshi no Koibito (9 episodes, 2007, TBS)
 Monster Parent (2008, Kansai TV)
 Kōshōnin (2008, TV Asahi)
 Koori No Hana (2008, TV Asahi)
 Kōshōnin 2 (2009, TV Asahi)
 Nasake no Onna (2010, TV Asahi)
 Hunter: Sono Onna-tachi, Shōkin Kasegi (2011, Fuji TV/Kansai TV)
 Atsui Kūki (2012, TV Asahi)
 35-sai no Koukousei (2013, Nippon TV)
 Doctor-X season 1 (2012, TV Asahi), Michiko Daimon
 Doctor X season 2 (2013, TV Asahi), Michiko Daimon 
 Kaseifu Wa Mita SP(2014, TV Asahi)
 Tsuyoki Ari SP (2014, TV Asahi)
 Outburn SP (2014, TV Asahi)
 Doctor X season 3 (2014, TV Asahi), Michiko Daimon
 Kaseifu wa Mita SP (2015, TV Asahi)
 Kagerou Ezu (2016, TV Asahi)
 Doctor X season 4 (2016, TV Asahi), Michiko Daimon
 Doctor X season 5 (2017, TV Asahi), Michiko Daimon
 Legal V Ex-lawyer Shoko Takanashi (2018, TV Asahi ), Shoko Takanashi
 Doctor X season 6 (2019, TV Asahi), Michiko Daimon
 Crayon Shin-chan (2019, TV Asahi) Anime, Michiko Daimon (voice)
 Doctor X season 7 (2021, TV Asahi), Michiko Daimon
 The Journalist (2022, Netflix)

Films
 Danbōru Hausu Gāru (homeless girl)
 Gun Crazy: A Woman from Nowhere (2002)
 Nezu no Ban (A Hardest Night!!) (2005)
 Sakura no Sono (2008)

Japanese dub
 Diana (2013) – voice: Diana (orig. Naomi Watts)
 Iron Man 2 (2010), The Avengers (2012), Captain America: The Winter Soldier (2014), Avengers: Age of Ultron (2015), Captain America: Civil War (2016), Avengers: Infinity War (2018), Avengers: Endgame (2019), Black Widow (2020) – voice: Natasha Romanoff / Black Widow (orig. Scarlett Johansson)
 Bullet Train (2022) – voice: Maria Beetle (orig. Sandra Bullock)

Personal life

In December 2014, Yonekura announced that she had married a company owner two years her junior. In December 2016, Yonekura announced that she had divorced her husband. In a written statement, Yonekura commented, "After timely, repeated discussions, our divorce has been finalized. I am sorry to have caused trouble with my private matters." She continued, "I hope to move forward both as an actress and woman. I will do my best every day in order to challenge myself to various new things. Please continue to give me guidance and encouragement.".

In October 2022, Yonekura announced she was withdrawing from performances of Chicago due to treatment for cerebro spinal fluid hypovolemia.   .

References

External links
 

Ryoko Yonekura at Artificial Beauty, Japanese series

1975 births
Living people
Actresses from Yokohama
Japanese actresses
Japanese female models
People from Kanagawa Prefecture
People from Yokohama